Carlo Margottini has been borne by at least two ships of the Italian Navy in honour of Carlo Margottini and may refer to:

 , a  launched in 1960 and stricken in 1988.
 , a Bergamini-class frigate launched in 2013. 

Italian Navy ship names